The Minerva Theatre is a studio theatre seating, at full capacity, 310. It is run as part of the adjacent Chichester Festival Theatre, located in Chichester, England, and was opened in 1989. The current artistic director is Daniel Evans.

Productions

University of Chichester
In November 2009, The Minerva allowed the University of Chichester's Musical Theatre Degree programme to perform a run of Oh, What a Lovely War!, lasting a week. The show was well received and garnered positive reviews. It was directed by Garth Bardsley, with musical direction by Julian Kelly.

References

External links
 Chichester Festival Theatre website

Theatres completed in 1989
Buildings and structures in Chichester
Tourist attractions in Chichester
Studio theatres in England
Theatres in West Sussex